Rami Gershon (born 12 August 1988) is an Israeli footballer who plays as a centre back or as a left back for Maccabi Haifa and the Israel national team.

Early life
Gershon was born in Rishon LeZion, Israel, to a family of Greek-Jewish descent.

Club career
Gershon began his career with Hapoel Rishon Lezion and joined on 6 July 2009 on trial to Standard Liège of the Jupiler League. After finishing the trial Liege loaned Gershon for one season with an option to buy him at the end which they eventually did at the summer of 2010 and immediately loaned him to K.V. Kortrijk for one season.

Celtic
On 9 January 2013, Celtic's Chief Executive, Peter Lawwell announced that Gershon had signed a loan deal until the end of the season. On 9 February 2013, Gershon made his Celtic début away to Inverness CT in the Scottish Premier League, managing to score and put Celtic into a 1–2 lead, the match ended 1–3.

K.A.A. Gent
2014, the Belgian team Gent transferred Gershon to Belgium. He was quite quickly one of the players in the basic team, and he was a mainstay in the 2015-Championship-team and a year later in the Champions League-campaign.

International career
Gershon has won 10 caps for the Israel U21 and 21 caps for Israel. On 12 October 2010 Gershon made his debut for Israel in the 1–2 loss to Greece, in a Euro 2012 Qualifier. On 11 October 2011, Gershon scored his first goal for the national team in Israel's 2–0 away win over Malta, also in the Euro 2012 qualifiers. On 22 March 2013, Gershon scored against Portugal in Ramat Gan Stadium in the 3–3 draw.

Personal life
In 2014, Gershon started dating Israeli model Neta Alchimister. They became engaged in 2018. They were married June, 2019.

Career statistics

International
Scores and results list Israel's goal tally first

Honours

Club
Celtic
 Scottish Premier League: 2012–13

Gent
 Belgian Pro League: 2014–15

Maccabi Haifa
 Israeli Premier League: 2020–21, 2021–22
 Toto Cup: 2021–22
 Israel Super Cup: 2021

References

1988 births
Living people
Israeli footballers
Israel international footballers
Hapoel Rishon LeZion F.C. players
Standard Liège players
K.V. Kortrijk players
Celtic F.C. players
S.K. Beveren players
K.A.A. Gent players
Maccabi Haifa F.C. players
Israel under-21 international footballers
Belgian Pro League players
Israeli Premier League players
Israeli expatriate footballers
Expatriate footballers in Belgium
Expatriate footballers in Scotland
Israeli expatriate sportspeople in Belgium
Israeli expatriate sportspeople in Scotland
Israeli people of Greek-Jewish descent
Association football central defenders
Association football fullbacks
Footballers from Rishon LeZion